Mauricio Giganti (born 6 November 1976) is a former Argentine footballer who played for clubs of Argentina, Chile, Costa Rica and Vietnam.

References
 

1976 births
Living people
Argentine footballers
Argentine expatriate footballers
Argentine football managers
Club Atlético Atlanta footballers
Club Almagro players
Boca Juniors footballers
Unión Española footballers
Provincial Osorno footballers
Deportes Melipilla footballers
Primera B de Chile players
Chilean Primera División players
Expatriate football managers in Chile
Expatriate footballers in Chile
Expatriate footballers in Vietnam
Association footballers not categorized by position
People from General Pico
Curicó Unido managers